
Ostróda County is a unit of territorial administration and local government (powiat) in Warmian-Masurian Voivodeship, northern Poland. It came into being on January 1, 1999, as a result of the Polish local government reforms passed in 1998.

As of 2006 its total population is 105,286, out of which the population of Ostróda is 33,419, that of Morąg is 14,497, that of Miłakowo is 2,665, that of Miłomłyn is 2,305, and the rural population is 52,400.

Neighbouring counties
Ostróda County is bordered by Lidzbark County to the north-east, Olsztyn County to the east, Nidzica County to the south-east, Działdowo County to the south, Iława County and Sztum County to the west, and Elbląg County to the north-west.

Administrative division
The county is subdivided into nine gminas (one urban, three urban-rural and five rural). These are listed in the following table, in descending order of population.

Historical population 
In 1828 Ostróda County (Kreis Osterode) had 32845 inhabitants, including by mother tongue: 23577 (~72%) Polish and 9268 (~28%) German.

References

 Polish official population figures 2006

 
Land counties of Warmian-Masurian Voivodeship